John Raymond "Dinny" McNamara (September 16, 1905 – December 20, 1963) was an American football and baseball player and coach.  He served as the head football coach at Boston College for the first four games of the 1935 season, compiling a record of 3–1.  He briefly played Major League Baseball with the Boston Braves in 1927 and 1928.

Baseball career
After graduating from Boston College in June 1927, McNamara signed as a free agent with the Boston Braves. He made his major league debut on July 2, 1927. In two seasons with the Braves, he played in 20 games, mostly as a pinch runner, had one hit in 13 at-bats for a batting average of .077, and scored five runs.  He also spent time with the Providence Grays of the New England League. In 1929, he played for Osterville of the Cape Cod Baseball League.

Coaching career
McNamara was the backfield coach at Fordham University under Frank Cavanaugh  from 1927 to 1932. In 1933, he served as an assistant to Joe McKenney at Boston College.  McNamara became head football coach at Boston College in 1935 after McKenney resigned to accept the post of associate director of physical education in the Boston public school system.  Midway through the 1935 season, McNamara resigned due to a "nervous ailment" and was replaced by Harry Downes.  His record at head coach was 3–1.  McNamara also served as the freshman baseball coach at Boston College.  He was killed on December 20, 1963 when he was hit by a car while walking near his home.

Head coaching record

Notes

References

External links

1905 births
1963 deaths
American football quarterbacks
Major League Baseball outfielders
Boston Braves players
Boston College Eagles baseball coaches
Boston College Eagles baseball players
Boston College Eagles football coaches
Boston College Eagles football players
Cape Cod Baseball League players (pre-modern era)
Hyannis Harbor Hawks players
Fordham Rams football coaches
Providence Grays (minor league) players
People from Lexington, Massachusetts
Players of American football from Massachusetts
Baseball players from Massachusetts
Pedestrian road incident deaths
Road incident deaths in Massachusetts
Sportspeople from Middlesex County, Massachusetts